Jerry D. Young Memorial Field, located in Birmingham, Alabama is the home field for the UAB Blazers baseball team. The stadium opened in 1984, and is named in honor of former UAB administrator Jerry D. Young, who was responsible for the establishment and early development of the program. It currently has a seating capacity of 1,000.

History
The facility opened on February 26, 1984, with the Blazers defeating the Vanderbilt Commodores 14–8. Approximately one year later, the stadium was renamed in honor of Jerry D. Young on April 18, 1985. By 1992 the facility served as the site for the first Great Midwest Conference Baseball Championship, in which the Blazers would be victorious. Through the 2007 season, UAB has an all-time record of 426-279-1 at Young Memorial Field.

See also
 List of NCAA Division I baseball venues

References

College baseball venues in the United States
UAB Blazers baseball
Baseball venues in Alabama
1984 establishments in Alabama
Sports venues completed in 1984